The Boston Palestine Film Festival (BPFF) is an annual film festival held in Boston, MA that was established in 2007. The festival brings Palestine-related cinema, narratives, and culture to New England audiences with the mission to "showcase the extraordinary narrative and culture of Palestinians through cinema and art." The thirteenth annual festival took place October 18–27, 2019.

Overview
Run by volunteers and co-presented by the Museum of Fine Arts, Boston, BPFF features documentaries, features, rare early works, video art pieces, as well as new films by emerging artists and youth. The selected works from directors around the world offer views of Palestine and its history, culture, and geographically dispersed society.

Each year, guest filmmakers from various countries and expert commentators are invited to be part of the festival and discuss their work with audiences. Since its founding in 2007, BPFF has presented over 300 Palestine-related films, as well as numerous major concerts, workshops, and art exhibits.

Winners

See also
Chicago Palestine Film Festival
DC Palestinian Film and Arts Festival

References

External links
Official website for the Boston Palestine Film Festival
Fifth Annual Boston Palestine Film Festival (2011) - Jadaliyya

Arab-American culture in Massachusetts
Film festivals in Boston
Palestinian-American culture
Cinema of the State of Palestine
Film festivals established in 2007
2007 establishments in Massachusetts